Paul Dale (born 1970) announced in July 2010 as the first CTO to be appointed to the management board at ITV plc, the oldest and largest commercial television network in the UK. Dale regards his family home to be Rowrah.

Early life and education 
Dale grew up and went to school in Workington, Cumberland (now Cumbria). He attended Stainburn School and went on to Sellafield to complete and apprenticeship as an instrument mechanic.

He studied at Lancaster University.

Career

Nuclear industry 
Dale completed an apprenticeship as an instrument mechanic with BNFL at their Sellafield site.

Media industry 
Dale started his media career in 1991.

He was founder and director of Bailrigg FM in 1994.

In 1995 he joined NDS at their Southampton Site as a Project Manager delivering CA and MPEG digital head ends.

In 2002 he was appointed as Technology Director at BSkyB in their Networked Media division.

In 2006 he joined the BBC as Controller of Future Media and Technology for BBC Vision.

In 2008 Dale was appointed CTO of Astro, Malaysia's DTH Satellite Pay TV Operator, based in Kuala Lumpur. It was under Paul's tenure as CTO that Astro B.yond was launched and introduced a Digital video recorder (The Astro B.yond PVR) on 1 June 2010, and later Video on Demand (VOD) and IPTV connectivity over his 24 months in Malaysia.

Paul Dale joined ITV in January 2011 as their first CTO and is part of the ITV Management Board and reported directly in to Adam Crozier.

In December 2013 Dale joined German TV Broadcaster ProSiebenSat.1 Media as their SVP, overseeing five digital businesses, Maxdome, ProSiebenSat.1 Digital, MyVideo, Ampya and Studio 71.

In November 2014 Dale joined multinational media and digital marketing communications company Dentsu Aegis Network as their Global Chief technology officer.

IT industry 
Dale's first two years at ITV were defined by the "Workplace Refresh" project, an 18-month programme of work consisting of 9 projects that rolled out a leading edge, mobile, consumerised, virtualised and cloud based IT solution to the whole company. The project has been globally recognised by the likes of Apple, Google, Citrix and Gartner as "industry defining" and world leading in key IT trends.

Under Dale's tenure as CTO at ITV they were awarded the "Global Innovation" award by Citrix in recognition of their pioneering approach to IT delivery.

In 2012 Dale was awarded CIO Top 50 status by Tech Republic.

In May 2012 Dale was a panelist in Google's Atmosphere on Tour event in London discussing his role in Business IT Transformation.

In January 2013 Dale was stated as being one of the Top 50 Global Social CIO's by The Huffington Post. due to his "good frequent content" on Twitter and actively "engaging" in social networks.

Other roles  
 2011 to 2013 Board Director, YouView, a joint venture among BBC, ITV plc, Channel 4, Channel 5, BT, TalkTalk, Arqiva and chaired by Lord Sugar
 2011 to 2013 Board Director, Freesat, a joint venture between BBC and ITV plc
 2011 to 2013 DTG Council Member

Personal life 
Dale is married to Tracy and has two sons, Joseph and Alexander.

References

1970 births
People from Workington
Alumni of Lancaster University
Living people
ITV people
People from Rowrah
Chief technology officers
Chief information officers